Finbar McConnell is a former Gaelic footballer who played for the Tyrone county team. He was Tyrone's first-choice goalkeeper throughout most of the nineties, and played in the 1995 All-Ireland Senior Football Championship Final. He set a Tyrone record for being the first Tyrone player to win four Ulster Championship medals in 2001.

References

External links
 Hogan Stand Magazine interview from early in his career ( 1992)
 Newtonstewart Club website detailing their county representatives' honours

1954 births
Living people
Gaelic football goalkeepers
Irish international rules football players
Tyrone inter-county Gaelic footballers